Chet Hanulak (March 28, 1933- September 10, 2021) was a former professional American football player who played running back for four seasons for the Cleveland Browns.

Hanulak played football at Hackensack High School and was recruited to play on the Maryland Terrapins football team after his high school coach met the Maryland coach while both were attending a summer course.  Nicknamed the "Jet," Hanulak was awarded All American status for his football accomplishments at the University of Maryland and still remains atop Maryland’s all-time rushing list, averaging 8.13 yards a touch over his three seasons. He was a member of the Gamma Chi Chapter of the Sigma Chi Fraternity at the University of Maryland.  Fellow Sigma Chi brothers of his at Maryland who were football All Americans included Bill Walker and Bob Pellegrini.

Hanulak, inducted into the Maryland Athletics Hall of Fame in 1994 and named an ACC Legend in 2012, died on September 10, 2021.

References

1933 births
American football running backs
Hackensack High School alumni
Players of American football from New Jersey
Maryland Terrapins football players
Cleveland Browns players
Living people
Sportspeople from Hackensack, New Jersey